Charles Robert "Bert" Kelly CMG (22 June 1912 – 17 January 1997), was an Australian politician and government minister.  He was influential in moving Australian political parties away from support for high-tariff policies.

Early life
Kelly was born in Tarlee, South Australia and educated at Prince Alfred College, Adelaide.  His father, Stan Kelly was a part-time Commissioner of the Commonwealth Tariff Board from 1929 to 1940, and supported its opposition to the high-tariff policies of successive Australian governments. He was a farmer before entering politics and in 1951, he was granted a Nuffield Fellowship to study farming in the United Kingdom.

Political career
Kelly was elected as the Liberal Party member for the House of Representatives seat of Wakefield at the 1958 election.  He was a passionate supporter of free trade, when this was very much a minority opinion in Australia.  Kelly was Minister for Works from February 1967 to February 1968 in the Holt and Gorton ministries and then Minister for the Navy until November 1969. As navy minister he dealt with the aftermath of the Melbourne–Evans collision in June 1969. His period as minister may have been limited by his free trade views.

After Kelly's departure from the ministry, he wrote a column in the Australian Financial Review, Modest Member, supporting free trade. When the seat of Angas was abolished in 1977, its member Geoffrey Giles beat Kelly for preselection for Wakefield.

Later life
Kelly renamed his column "Modest Farmer" and it was published successively in the Australian Financial Review, The Bulletin and The Australian.  He was invested as a Companion of the Most Distinguished Order of St Michael and St George (CMG) in 1980.  Survived by his wife, Lorna and three sons, Kelly's funeral was attended by former Labor Prime Minister Gough Whitlam and Ray Evans, the former head of Western Mining Corporation and president of the right-wing H. R. Nicholls Society.

Notes

1912 births
1997 deaths
Liberal Party of Australia members of the Parliament of Australia
Members of the Australian House of Representatives for Wakefield
Members of the Australian House of Representatives
People educated at Prince Alfred College
Australian Companions of the Order of St Michael and St George
20th-century Australian politicians
South Australian politicians